Longyuan may refer to:

 Longquan, formerly Longyuan County (龙渊)
 Longyuan Subdistrict, seat of Longquan
 Longyuan Power (龙源)